The 2019 Nobel Memorial Prize in Economic Sciences was awarded jointly to the economist couple Abhijit Banerjee (b. 1961), Esther Duflo-Banerjee (b. 1972) and their colleague Michael Kremer (b. 1964) "for their experimental approach to alleviating global poverty." Banerjee and Duflo are the sixth married couple to jointly win a Nobel Prize. The  pressed release of the Royal Swedish Academy of Sciences noted:  Their key contribution to economics is the usage of randomized controlled trials (RCT) in development economics.

Laureates

Abhijit Banerjee

Abhijit Banerjee was born to a Bengali father and to a Marathi mother in Mumbai. His father, Dipak Banerjee, was a professor of economics at Presidency College, Calcutta, and his mother Nirmala Banerjee (née Patankar), a professor of economics at the Centre for Studies in Social Sciences, Calcutta. His father, Dipak Banerjee, earned a PhD in economics from the London School of Economics. He received his school education in South Point High School, a renowned educational institution in Calcutta. After his schooling, he took admission at Presidency College, then an affiliated college of the University of Calcutta and now an autonomous university, where he completed his BSc(H) degree in economics in 1981. Later, he completed his M.A. in economics at the Jawaharlal Nehru University (JNU), Delhi in 1983. While studying in JNU, he was arrested and imprisoned in Tihar Jail during a protest after students gheraoed the then Vice Chancellor PN Srivastava of the university. He was released on bail and charges were subsequently dropped against the students. Later, he went on to obtain a PhD from Harvard University in 1988. The subject of his doctoral thesis was "Essays in Information Economics." In 2015, Banerjee married his co-researcher, MIT professor Esther Duflo; they have two children.

Esther Duflo-Banerjee

Duflo was born in 1972 in Paris, the daughter of pediatrician Violaine Duflo and mathematics professor Michel Duflo. During Duflo's childhood, her mother often participated in medical humanitarian projects. After studying in the B/L program of Lycée Henri-IV's Classes préparatoires, Duflo began her undergraduate studies at École normale supérieure in Paris, planning to study history, her interest since childhood. In her second year, she began considering a career in the civil service or politics. She spent ten months in Moscow starting in 1993. She taught French and worked on a history thesis that described how the Soviet Union "had used the big construction sites, like the Stalingrad tractor factory, for propaganda, and how propaganda requirements changed the actual shape of the projects." She finished her degree in history and economics at École Normale Supérieure in 1994 and received a master's degree from DELTA, now the Paris School of Economics, jointly with the School for Advanced Studies in the Social Sciences (EHESS) of the Université Paris Sciences et Lettres (PSL) and the École Normale Supérieure, in 1995. Subsequently, she obtained a PhD degree in economics at MIT in 1999, under the joint supervision of Abhijit Banerjee and Joshua Angrist. Her doctoral dissertation focused on effects of a natural experiment involving an Indonesian school-expansion program in the 1970s, and it provided conclusive evidence that in a developing country, more education resulted in higher wages. Upon completing her doctorate, she was appointed assistant professor of economics at MIT and has been at MIT ever since, aside from a leave at Princeton University in 2001–2002, and at the Paris School of Economics in 2007 and 2017.

Michael Kremer

Michael Robert Kremer was born in 1964 to Eugene and Sara Lillian (née Kimmel) Kremer in New York City. He graduated from Harvard University (A.B. in Social Studies in 1985 and Ph.D. in economics in 1992). A postdoctoral fellow at Massachusetts Institute of Technology (MIT) from 1992 to 1993, Kremer was a visiting assistant professor at the University of Chicago in Spring 1993, and professor at MIT from 1993 to 1999. From 1999 to 2020, he was a professor at Harvard University. He joined the faculty at the University of Chicago as a professor in the Kenneth C. Griffin Department of Economics, the college, and the Harris School of Public Policy on September 1, 2020.

References

2019
2019 awards